Jennifer Rachel Bibbings is a British lawyer, residing in the United Arab Emirates, working as a lawyer and honorary legal advisor to the British Consulate in Dubai and the Northern Emirates. She was awarded the Officer of the Most Excellent Order of the British Empire in 2014 for her contributions to the community and for strengthening relations between the UK and the UAE.

Biography 
Jennifer Rachel Bibbings was born in 1963 in the UK.
She is married, has a son and a daughter and resides in Dubai.

Career 
Bibbings first came to Dubai in 1993 and a year later, started working pro bono as a legal advisor to the British Consulate in Dubai and the Northern Emirates. She is the partner of the legal firm, Trowers and Hamlins LLP in Dubai.

Positions held 
Jennifer Bibbings was the female committee member of the British Business Group of Dubai and the Northern Emirates and later became its first female chair during 2003 to 2006. She also helped to set up the British University in Dubai in 2004. She serves as governor of Jebel Ali Primary School, one of Dubai's oldest schools.

Awards and recognitions 
Bibbings was awarded the Order of the British Empire in 2014. She is also listed in the Chambers and Partners’ Global Guide and The Legal 500 Guide for the corporate and commercial fields.

References

External links
 Queen's Honours List
 on Findlaw web site
 Reference on Duedil
 Reference on the Law Society site
 Honours List
 on Open Corporates
 News

1963 births
Living people
British solicitors
British diaspora in Asia
Officers of the Order of the British Empire